Conspiracy is the debut studio album by American hip hop group Junior M.A.F.I.A., released on August 29, 1995, by Big Beat Records and Atlantic Records.

Upon its release, the album garnered much attention, gaining hype with the release of singles such as "Get Money" and "Player's Anthem". The album features rapper The Notorious B.I.G., who contributes to the album's production in addition to appearing on four of the album's tracks, as well as being its lead songwriter. The album's third single "Get Money", contains a sample from "You Can't Turn Me Away" performed by Sylvia Striplin.

Critical reception

Conspiracy was a commercial success and received mixed critical reviews. Stephen Thomas Erlewine of AllMusic wrote, "Considering Ready to Die was one of the seminal hip-hop releases of the early '90s, Conspiracy could have been an inspired, enjoyable sequel; instead, it's a fitfully successful replication of the earlier record's strengths."

Commercial performance
Conspiracy debuted at number eight on the US Billboard 200, selling 69,000 copies in its first week.

The album was certified gold by the Recording Industry Association of America (RIAA) on December 6, 1995.

Track listing

Sample credits
White Chalk
 "The What" by The Notorious B.I.G. feat. Method Man
 "Things Done Changed" by The Notorious B.I.G.
Back Stabbers
"Back Stabbers" by The O'Jays
"Your Smile" by René & Angela
Crazaay
"Can't We Smile" by Johnny Hammond
Get Money
"You Can't Turn Me Away" by Sylvia Striplin
I Need You Tonight
"Remind Me" by Patrice Rushen
"I Wonder If I Take You Home" by Lisa Lisa & Cult Jam and Full Force
Oh My Lord
"The World Is Yours" by Nas
Player's Anthem
"You Are What I'm All About" by New Birth
"Yellowman & Fathead" by Yellowman and Fathead
"Zungguzungguguzungguzeng" by Yellowman
Realms of Junior M.A.F.I.A
"UFO" by ESG
Murder Onze
"Laughter in the Rain" by Earl Klugh

Charts

Weekly charts

Year-end charts

Certifications

References

1995 debut albums
Big Beat Records (American record label) albums
Junior M.A.F.I.A. albums

Atlantic Records albums